The 2011 ITS Cup was a professional tennis tournament played on clay courts. It was the third edition of the tournament which was part of the 2011 ITF Women's Circuit. It took place in Olomouc, Czech Republic between 25 and 31 July 2011.

WTA entrants

Seeds

 1 Rankings are as of July 18, 2011.

Other entrants
The following players received wildcards into the singles main draw:
  Jara Ghadri
  Khristina Kazimova
  Nastja Kolar
  Martina Kubičíková

The following players received entry from the qualifying draw:
  Dijana Banoveć
  Audrey Bergot
  Nastassya Burnett
  Nina Zander

Champions

Singles

 Nastassya Burnett def.  Eva Birnerová, 6–1, 6–3

Doubles

 Michaëlla Krajicek /  Renata Voráčová def.  Yuliya Beygelzimer /  Elena Bogdan, 7–5, 6–4

External links
ITF Search 
Official website

ITS Cup
ITS
2011 in Czech tennis
2011 in Czech women's sport